The Ontario Libertarian Party (OLP) ran 18 candidates in the 1995 provincial election, none of whom were elected.  The Party received a total of 6,085 votes.

Douglas Quinn (Dovercourt)
Quinn campaigned for both the Libertarian Party of Canada and the OLP during the early 1990s.  He was 25 years old at the time of the 1990 election, and marketed computer software.  He campaigned on a platform of ending government subsidies and reducing taxes and bureaucracy (Toronto Star, 25 August 1990).  Quinn emphasized the same themes in 1995, while also supporting reduced government restriction over prostitution and drugs (Toronto Star, 5 June 1995).

Roma Kelembet (York South)
Kelembet is of Ukrainian background, and arrived in Canada in 1951.  She was president of Viceroy Business Forms Inc. during the 1980s and 1990s, and was listed as president of the Libertarian Party of Canada in 1990 (TS, 25 November 1990).  She campaigned for the federal and provincial Libertarian Parties on a total of five occasions.

Kelembet attracted local attention in 1989, after calling for small businessmen in the Toronto area to align with the Alberta-based group "Canadians for Greater Government Accountability" in opposing the federal government's Goods and Services Tax (Toronto Star, 4 October 1989).  She herself refused to collect the tax in protest against the measure (TS, 22 October 1989).

In 1993, Kelembet called for immigrants, non-residents and refugees to be required to purchase private health insurance before coming to Canada (Financial Post, 4 August 1993).  She later wrote that Canada's immigration policy should stipulate that each immigrant is "responsible for his/her own survival" after arriving in the country, so as to reduce abuse in the system (Financial Post, 5 April 1994).

During the 1995 campaign, she promised to repeal labour laws and eliminate welfare (Toronto Star, 5 June 1995).  She was listed as fifty-seven years old. She died Dec. 3, 2017.

References

1995